The European Court of Human Rights is an international tribunal established for enforcement of the European Convention on Human Rights. It is an organ of the Council of Europe and judges are elected to the Court by the Council's Parliamentary Assembly in respect of each Member State. However, they do not represent the state, as they hear cases as individuals. Judges of the Court as of 8 April 2020 are, in order of precedence:

Sections
The Court is divided into five Sections, to which each of the judges is randomly assigned.

See also

 List of members of the European Court of Justice

Notes

 
European